Asia is a geographical continent containing the central and eastern part of Eurasia.

Asia may also refer to:

Places
Asia District, Peru, a beach district
Asia District, Oklahoma City, Oklahoma, United States
Asia Islands, islands in Indonesia close to Palau
Asia Minor, a peninsula containing Asia and several other Roman provinces
Asia-Pacific, the part of the world in or near the Western Pacific Ocean
Asia (Roman province), a part of the Roman Empire occupying the Anatolian peninsula (in modern-day Turkey)
Asia, Tennessee, United States, an unincorporated community
Asia, Texas, United States, an unincorporated community

People with the name

Given name
Asia Agcaoili (born 1977), Filipino actress
Asia Alfasi (born 1984), British writer
Asia Ramazan Antar (1997-2016), Kurdish fighter
Asia Argento (born 1975), Italian actress
Asia Bibi (born 1971), Pakistani Christian woman Aasiya Noreen who was acquitted of blasphemy
Asia Carrera (born 1973), American pornographic actress
Asia Booth Clarke (1835-1888), American writer
Asia Cruise (born 1990), American singer
Asia D'Amato (born 2003), Italian artistic gymnast
Asia Kate Dillon (born 1984), American actor
Asia Durr (born 1997), American basketball player
Asia Hogan-Rochester (born 1999), Canadian rugby sevens player
Asia Khattak, Pakistani politician
Asia Muhammad (born 1991), American tennis player
Asia Nitollano (born 1988), former member of The Pussycat Dolls
Asia O'Hara (born 1982), American drag queen
Asia Ray Smith (born 1988), American actress
Asia Taylor (born 1991), American basketball player
Asia Vieira (born 1982), Canadian actress

Surname
Daniel Asia (born 1953), American composer

Others
Asiya, in Islam, adoptive mother of Moses and wife of the last Pharaoh
Asia of Diauehi, king of the ancient people of the Diauehi in northeastern Anatolia (circa 850–825 BC)
Mr Asia or Marty Johnstone, New Zealand drug dealer

Mythology
For mythological figures named Asia in greek mythology,such as the Oceanid or the Nereid in Greek mythology, see Asia (Greek myth)

Music
Asia (band), an English rock band
Asia (Asia album) first album published by that band
Asia (Boris album)

Other uses
Asia (film), a 2020 Israeli film
American Spinal Injury Association (ASIA)
ASIA, Autoimmune/inflammatory syndrome induced by adjuvants, also known as Shoenfeld's syndrome
Asia (magazine), an American magazine in the 1920s and 1930s
Asia (Miami), a residential skyscraper
Asia (ship), numerous ships so-named over the centuries
Asia (soft drink brand)
Asia Motors, a Korean car manufacturer acquired by Hyundai's Kia Motors unit
Asia, a sculpture in front of the Alexander Hamilton U.S. Custom House

See also
Ayesha (disambiguation)